Calvin Wiggett (born July 14, 1966) is a Canadian country music singer. Wiggett recorded one studio album for Royalty Records, 1995's Made for Each Other. This album produced four chart singles for him on the Canadian country music charts, of which the highest was the No. 13-peaking "Love Music Loves to Dance."

Biography
Though he was born in Regina, Saskatchewan, Wiggett has lived all over the world, from Bienfait, Saskatchewan to Williston, North Dakota to Calgary, Alberta to Tehran, Iran. After moving to Calgary, Wiggett entered his first singing contest in 1989, where he finished in the semi-finals. He continued entering contests, eventually winning CFCW's Star Search Talent Contest on February 26, 1995.

Later that year, Wiggett was signed to Royalty Records and released his first album, Made for Each Other. His first single, "Missing You", was released on September 1, 1995, with an accompanying video sent to NCN. The song reached the top 20 on the Canadian country singles chart, as did the follow-up, "Love Music Loves to Dance." In 1996, Wiggett was nominated for Best Male Artist at the RPM Big Country Awards, and Best Country Male Vocalist at the prestigious Juno Awards. He also received several nominations from the Alberta Recording Industry Association (ARIA) in 1996 and 1997.

On September 7, 1996, it was announced that Wiggett had signed an American record deal with Arista Nashville. As he traveled between Toronto and Nashville working on his second album, Wiggett continued to maintain his career in Canada with the singles "I Know What It's Not" and "Made for Each Other." Wiggett's second album was completed in 1998, but Arista ultimately chose not to release the project.

Discography

Albums

Singles

Music videos

References

External links
Calvin Wiggett Official Site

1966 births
Living people
Canadian country singers
Canadian male singers
Musicians from Regina, Saskatchewan
Arista Nashville artists